John Sotheby (1740 – 1 November 1807) was an English auctioneer, who is the eponym of the famous auction house Sotheby's.

Background
Auction house Baker and Leigh, was founded in London on 11 March 1744,
He was the nephew of Samuel Baker, who was the founder of the book auctioneering firm which later became Sotheby's.

After his uncle's death in 1778, John became a partner in his book auctioneering firm along with George Leigh. He expanded the scope of business of the firm to include the sale of prints, medals, coins, and rare antiquities apart from books.

He died on 1 November 1807 in Chigwell.

References

English businesspeople
1740 births
1807 deaths
English auctioneers
John